Casey Michael Fien (born October 21, 1983), is an American former professional baseball pitcher. He played in Major League Baseball (MLB) for the Detroit Tigers, Minnesota Twins, Los Angeles Dodgers, Seattle Mariners, and Philadelphia Phillies.

Career
Fien attended John F. Kennedy High School in La Palma, California. For college, he attended William Penn University, Golden West College, and Cal Poly San Luis Obispo. At Cal Poly, he was roommates with fellow MLB pitcher Bud Norris.

Detroit Tigers
The Detroit Tigers selected Fien in the 20th round of the 2006 MLB draft. He was called up by the Tigers on July 24, 2009 from the Toledo Mud Hens to replace Eddie Bonine.

On February 23, 2010, Fien was designated for assignment to make roster room for the newly acquired Johnny Damon. On March 1, 2010 he was selected off waivers by the Boston Red Sox, and then selected again by the Toronto Blue Jays on March 4. The Blue Jays released him on March 18 and he rejoined the Tigers on March 20.

On June 29, 2010, he was purchased from Triple-A to replace Joel Zumaya, who was placed on the 15-day disabled list. He was sent back down to Toledo on June 3. They called him back up on July 20. He was again sent back down to Toledo on July 21. He filed for free agency after the season ended.

Houston Astros
In November 2010, Fien signed a minor league contract with the Houston Astros. He was released during the season.

Minnesota Twins
In 2011, Fien signed a minor league contract with the Minnesota Twins.

On July 4, 2012, Fien was called up to the majors from the Triple A Rochester Red Wings, after the Twins optioned Nick Blackburn.

On July 8, 2012, Fien made his debut with the Twins, pitching a scoreless 8th inning against the Texas Rangers.

He finished 2012 making appearances in 35 games for the Twins, finishing the year with a 2–1 record and 4.30 ERA with 32 strikeouts.

In 2013, Fien finished the year with a 5–2 record and a 3.92 ERA in 73 appearances for the Twins, striking out 73 and walking 12.

On May 5, 2016, Fien was designated for assignment by the Twins.

Los Angeles Dodgers
On May 7, 2016, Fien was claimed off waivers by the Los Angeles Dodgers. He joined the Dodgers bullpen on May 28, after spending several weeks with the AAA Oklahoma City Dodgers. He was designated for assignment on September 10, 2016. On September 13, 2016, Fien cleared waivers and was assigned to Triple-A Oklahoma City. In 25 games for the Dodgers he had a 4.21 ERA.

Seattle Mariners
Fien signed a one-year deal with the Seattle Mariners on December 3, 2016. After 5 appearances early in the season, Fien was outrighted off the 40 man roster on April 12.

Philadelphia Phillies
On May 9, 2017 the Philadelphia Phillies acquired Fien via trade from the Seattle Mariners for cash consideration and assigned him to the AAA Lehigh Valley IronPigs. He was released on September 1, 2017

Family
Fien is the nephew of Republican California State Senators George and Sharon Runner, the first husband and wife in California history to serve concurrently in the California State Legislature when George was a Senator and Sharon an Assemblywoman.

References

External links

1983 births
Living people
Sportspeople from Santa Rosa, California
Baseball players from California
Major League Baseball pitchers
Detroit Tigers players
Minnesota Twins players
Los Angeles Dodgers players
Seattle Mariners players
Philadelphia Phillies players
William Penn Statesmen baseball players
Cal Poly Mustangs baseball players
Erie SeaWolves players
Oneonta Tigers players
Toledo Mud Hens players
Mesa Solar Sox players
Leones de Ponce players
West Michigan Whitecaps players
Gulf Coast Astros players
Oklahoma City RedHawks players
Rochester Red Wings players
Algodoneros de Guasave players
American expatriate baseball players in Mexico
Oklahoma City Dodgers players
Rancho Cucamonga Quakes players
Tacoma Rainiers players
Lehigh Valley IronPigs players
Anchorage Glacier Pilots players